Alfredo Morales (born May 12, 1990) is a professional soccer player who plays as a defensive midfielder for New York City FC in Major League Soccer. Born in Germany, he represented the United States national team.

Club career 
Morales took his first steps at Borussia Pankow in the east of Berlin. In November 2008, Morales played his first match for Hertha BSC II in the Regionalliga. In 2010, he was allowed to travel with the professional players to the summer training camp for first time, though he could not make it to the squad. Due to injuries to Fanol Perdedaj and Raffael, however, he made his professional debut for Hertha's first team on December 5, 2010, in a match against 1860 Munich, which Hertha lost 0–1.

On May 17, 2013, Morales joined FC Ingolstadt on a two-year contract. Morales received a red card in the 80th minute of Ingolstadt's opening match against Erzgebirge Aue on July 19, 2013, after earning a spot in the starting XI. On May 16, 2018 Morales joined newly promoted Bundesliga team Fortuna Düsseldorf.

On April 7, 2021, Morales joined Major League Soccer club New York City FC on a three year contract through the 2023 season with an option for 2024.

International career
Morales was eligible to play for the United States through his father, who was born in Peru but is an American citizen and served in the U.S. military. Morales was called up by the senior U.S. squad for the November 2011 European friendlies. Morales made his first appearance for the national on January 29, 2013, in an international friendly against Canada, coming on as a substitute in the 75th minute.

Morales had considered playing for Peru since his father is from Chimbote, Peru. Sergio Markarián, then coach of the Peru national team, had shown interest in the German-born player. Morales was cap tied to the United States on July 13, 2015, when he started against Panama in the 2015 CONCACAF Gold Cup. The day after, however, he was replaced by Joe Corona on the roster, as each squad that advanced to the knockout stage could make six changes to their roster.

Career statistics

Honors
New York City FC
MLS Cup: 2021

References

External links 
 
 
 

1990 births
Living people
Footballers from Berlin
American soccer players
United States men's international soccer players
United States men's under-23 international soccer players
United States men's under-20 international soccer players
German footballers.
American sportspeople of Peruvian descent
American people of German descent
German people of Peruvian descent
German people of American descent
Sportspeople of American descent
Citizens of the United States through descent
Association football defenders
Association football midfielders
Hertha BSC II players
Hertha BSC players
FC Ingolstadt 04 players
Fortuna Düsseldorf players
New York City FC players
Regionalliga players
2. Bundesliga players
Bundesliga players
2015 CONCACAF Gold Cup players
Major League Soccer players